Hertel is an unincorporated community in the town of La Follette, Burnett County, Wisconsin, United States.  It is along Wisconsin Highway 70.  Hertel is 14 miles west of Spooner, and 12 miles east of Siren.

The community was named for its first postmaster, Otto Hertel, who opened the post office in July 1898. The post office closed on September 13, 1997.

References

Unincorporated communities in Burnett County, Wisconsin
Unincorporated communities in Wisconsin